Benjamin Nkonjera (died 13 March 1999) was a Zimbabwean football midfielder. Besides Zimbabwe, he played in Switzerland.

References

Year of birth missing
1999 deaths
Zimbabwean footballers
Zimbabwe international footballers
Highlanders F.C. players
SC Kriens players
Association football midfielders
Zimbabwean expatriate footballers
Expatriate footballers in Switzerland
Zimbabwean expatriate sportspeople in Switzerland